The Hamilton Mechanics was a primary moniker of the minor league baseball teams based in Hamilton, Ohio between 1884 and 1913. Hamilton teams played as members of the Ohio State League in 1884, Tri-State League in 1889 and Ohio State League in 1911 and 1913.

History
Minor league baseball was first hosted in Hamilton, Ohio in 1884. The Hamilton team became charter members of the six–team Ohio State League. The Chillicothe Logans, Dayton Gem Citys, Ironton, Portsmouth Riversides and Springfield teams joined Chillicothe in beginning 1884 league play. After three teams folded from the during the season, the Hamilton team finished the complete season in 3rd place with a record of 26–42. Playing under managers Amos Booth and Rousseau, Hamilton finished 19.0 games behind the 1st place Dayton Gem Citys.

In 1889, Hamilton fielded a team as a member of the six–team Tri-State League. The Hamilton team was joined by the Canton Nadjys, Dayton Reds, Mansfield Indians, Springfield and Wheeling Nailers teams in league play. Hamilton finished in 5th place in the final standings. With a final record of 41–65, Hamilton was managed by D.C. Blandy and Edward Hengle, ending the season 27.0 games behind the 1st place Canton Nadjys. Hamilton folded from the league following the 1889 season, as the 1890 Tri–State League expanded to eight teams without a Hamilton franchise.

Minor league baseball returned to Hamilton in 1911. The Class D level Ohio State League expanded from six teams to eight teams, adding the Hamilton "Mechanics" and Springfield Reapers as expansion franchises. The two new teams joined the Chillicothe Infants, Lancaster Lanks, Lima Cigarmakers, Marion Diggers, Newark Newks and Portsmouth Cobblers in the 1911 Ohio State League play.

The Hamilton Mechanics finished last in the 1911 Ohio State League final standings. Compiling a 48–92 record, the Mechanics placed 8th in the final standings. Managed by Jim Barton and Frank Locke, Hamilton finished 36.5 games behind the 1st place Springfield Reapers in the Ohio State League standings. Hamilton did nor return to the 1912 Ohio State League as the league reduced to six teams.

The Hamilton use of the "Mechanics" moniker corresponds to local industry and history. Buoyed by the Hamilton Hydraulic System, Hamilton, Ohio grew to become a major manufacturing center in the era, with local facilities producing numerous machines and equipment. Companies such as Hooven-Owens-Rentschler, Champion Coated Paper, Niles Tool Works, and Estate Stove were located in Hamilton, Ohio in the era.

In their final season of play, Hamilton rejoined the 1913 Ohio State League, as the league again expanded to become an eight–team league. The newly named Hamilton Maroons resumed play, with the Huntington Blue Sox joining Hamilton as an expansion franchise in the league. The Hamilton Maroons finished their final season of play in 7th place. Playing under manager Zeke Wrigley, the Maroons ended the season with a 55–79 record, finishing 29.0 games behind the 1st place Chillicothe Babes. The Hamilton franchise folded following the 1913 season.

Hamilton, Ohio has not hosted another minor league team. Today, Hamilton hosts the Hamilton Joes franchise of the Great Lakes Summer Collegiate League, who began play in 2015.

The ballpark
The Hamilton minor league teams were noted to have played 1911 and 1913 home games at the North End Athletic Field. The ballpark was located on Ford Boulevard (Joe Nuxhall Boulevard) between Stout Street & Poplar Street. Today, the park still in use as a public park with ballfields, renamed L.J. Smith Park. The location is 1150 Joe Nuxhall Boulevard, Hamilton, Ohio.

Timeline

Year-by-year record

Notable alumni

Amos Booth (1884, MGR)
Sim Bullas (1884)
Harry Daubert (1913)
John Dolan (1889)
Bob Gilks (1884)
Ed Hengel (1889)
George Hogreiver (1889)
Harry Huston (1913)
Harry Kessler (1884)
Pat Lyons (1889)
Karl Meister (1913)
Bobby Mitchell (1884)
Frank Monroe (1884)
Bill Niles (1889)
Billy Otterson (1884)
Jim Roxburgh (1884)
John Shoupe (1889)
Alex Voss (1889)
Podge Weihe (1889)
George Winkleman (1884)
Zeke Wrigley (1913, MGR)

See also
Hamilton Maroons playersHamilton (minor league baseball) players

References

External links
Baseball Reference

Defunct minor league baseball teams
Professional baseball teams in Ohio
Defunct baseball teams in Ohio
Baseball teams established in 1911
Baseball teams disestablished in 1911
Ohio State League teams
Hamilton, Ohio